Stéphane Maurice Dion  (born 28 September 1955) is a Canadian diplomat, academic and former politician who has been the Canadian ambassador to France and Monaco since 2022 and special envoy to the European Union since 2017. Dion was Leader of the Opposition and the leader of the Liberal Party from 2006 to 2008. He served in cabinets as intergovernmental affairs minister (1996–2003), environment minister (2003–2006), and foreign affairs minister (2015–2017).

Before entering politics, Dion was a professor of political science at the Université de Montréal. His research focused on Canadian federalism and public administration. Throughout his tenure in government, Dion held a number of portfolios. He was first named Minister of Intergovernmental Affairs by Prime Minister Chrétien in 1996, following the aftermath of the 1995 Quebec sovereignty referendum. His reference question to the Supreme Court of Canada, produced Reference Re Secession of Quebec and his Clarity Act, which provided guidelines for subsequent referendums. He returned to the backbench in 2003 when Paul Martin became the prime minister and dropped a number of ministers in an effort to disassociate himself from the former Chrétien government. After the 2004 election however, he returned to Cabinet as Minister of Environment, where he was in charge of implementing the Kyoto Protocol and chaired COP 11/CMP 1 when Montreal hosted the UN climate conference in 2005.

The Liberal government lost the 2006 election and Martin resigned as leader. Dion campaigned to replace him and subsequently won the party leadership election. Dion ran on an environmental platform in the 2008 federal election, but was defeated by the Conservatives led by Prime Minister Stephen Harper in one of the Liberals' worst electoral showings. After a subsequent parliamentary dispute, he was replaced as leader by Michael Ignatieff. Dion continued to sit as the member of Parliament for Saint-Laurent. In 2015, the Liberal Party returned to power and Dion was named Minister of Foreign Affairs under Prime Minister Justin Trudeau, serving until 2017, when he left politics and assumed his current diplomatic postings.

Early and personal life 
Dion was born on 28 September 1955 in Quebec City, the second of five children. His mother, Denyse (née Kormann), was a real-estate agent born in Paris, France, and his father, Léon Dion, was a Quebec academic. Dion holds dual citizenship in France because of his French-born mother. Dion was raised in a modest home on boulevard Liégeois in Sillery, today part of Quebec City. While growing up, he remembers being taunted for his family's secularism in a society which was then predominantly Roman Catholic.

Dion was involved with the sovereignty movement, first as a teenager attending a Jesuit college in Quebec City, and later as a university student campaigning for Parti Québécois candidate Louise Beaudoin in the 1976 election. Dion described his experience as follows:

Dion has said that his involvement as "an activist for the separatist cause" ended during a five-hour discussion with a federalist household while he was going door-to-door for the PQ, but he did not openly commit to federalism until much later. At the time of the 1980 referendum, his sentiments were neutral. In his own words, the 'no' victory left him "neither moved nor outraged. To tell the truth, I felt no particular feeling." (Moi, je ne me sentais ni ému ni révolté. À vrai dire, je n'éprouvais aucun sentiment particulier.)

He studied political science at Université Laval in the department co-founded by his father; this was also where he met his future wife, Janine Krieber, a fellow student in the same program. In April 1986, Stéphane Dion married Krieber, and later the same year, they travelled to Peru to adopt their only child, Jeanne Krieber-Dion. His wife is an "expert in strategic studies and counter-terrorism issues," who teaches political science and sociology at Royal Military College Saint-Jean in Saint-Jean-sur-Richelieu.

Education and academic career (1977–1996) 
After Dion obtained BA and MA degrees in 1977 and 1979 respectively (his master's thesis presented an analysis of the evolution of Parti Québécois electoral strategies), he and Krieber departed together for France.

Dion spent four years in Paris, living with Janine in the Montmartre district and studying public administration under the tutelage of noted sociologist Michel Crozier. After receiving a doctorate (doctorat d'état) in sociology from the Institut d'Études Politiques de Paris (commonly known as Sciences Po), Dion worked briefly as a teaching assistant at the Université de Moncton in 1984 before moving on to the Université de Montréal to assume an assistant professor position. Dion taught there from 1984 to January 1996, specializing in public administration and organizational analysis and theory, and was a guest scholar at the Brookings Institution in Washington, D.C., during a 1990–91 sabbatical leave.

After the failure of the Meech Lake Accord in 1990, Dion directed his intellectual inquiry towards an analysis of Quebec nationalism. His decisive conversion to federalism, as he later recounted to journalist Michel Vastel, occurred as he was preparing for a presentation in Washington:

In this period, the sovereignty movement had begun to promote the idea that federalism was inefficient for Quebec due to the duplication and overlap between the two levels of government. An expert in public administration, Dion emerged as a key figure in publicly criticizing this line of argument. His appearances on Le Point, a Télévision de Radio-Canada current affairs program, brought him to the attention of Aline Chrétien, who in the days following the close referendum defeat urged her husband, Prime Minister Jean Chrétien, to recruit him.

Between 1987 and 1995, Dion published a number of books and articles on political science, public administration and management. A collection of Dion's speeches and writings on Canadian unity was published under the title Straight Talk (Le pari de la franchise) in 1999. Dion was also a guest scholar at the Laboratoire d'économie publique de Paris from 1994 to 1995, a co-editor of the Canadian Journal of Political Science from 1990 to 1993, and a research fellow at the Canadian Centre for Management Development (now part of the Canada School of Public Service) from 1990 to 1991.

Political career (1996–2017)

Minister of Intergovernmental Affairs (1996–2003) 
In anticipation of by-elections in early 1996, Prime Minister Jean Chrétien appointed two new "star candidates" from Quebec — Stéphane Dion and Pierre Pettigrew – to Cabinet. On 25 January 1996, Dion was named Minister of Intergovernmental Affairs, Pettigrew was named Minister for International Cooperation, and both were sworn into the Queen's Privy Council for Canada.

Chrétien felt safe in appointing Dion to Cabinet because Dion was slated to run in Saint-Laurent—Cartierville, the second-safest Liberal riding in Quebec. In 25 March by-election, he was easily elected. This was not without precedent; in 1941, Mackenzie King had appointed Louis St. Laurent to Cabinet after nominating him to run in a safe Quebec riding. Dion would hold the riding in general election of 1997, and was re-elected again in the 2000, 2004, 2006, 2008, 2011, and 2015 elections. Dion continued to serve as Minister of Intergovernmental Affairs until the end of Jean Chrétien's ministry on 12 December 2003.

Clarity of referendum question 
In his responsibilities as Intergovernmental Affairs minister in the Jean Chrétien government, Dion was tasked with challenging the arguments of the Quebec sovereignty movement much more vigorously than in the pre-referendum period. The people of Quebec voted against the sovereignty option by a razor-thin margin (50.58% to 49.42%). Many federalists in Ottawa were caught off-guard by the results and believed that the referendum results would have no legal standing under Canadian law. The strongest complaints were on the presumed ambiguity of the 1995 question and that Quebec had tabled a law reserving the right for the National Assembly to declare independence unilaterally if constitutional negotiations with the Government of Canada failed.

Supreme Court reference re secession of Quebec 
On 30 September 1996, Dion submitted three questions to the Supreme Court of Canada constituting the Supreme Court Reference re Secession of Quebec:

Under the Constitution of Canada, can the National Assembly, legislature, or government of Quebec effect the secession of Quebec from Canada unilaterally? 
Does international law give the National Assembly, legislature, or government of Quebec the right to effect the secession of Quebec from Canada unilaterally? In this regard, is there a right to self-determination under international law that would give the National Assembly, legislature or government of Quebec the right to effect the secession of Quebec from Canada unilaterally?
In the event of a conflict between domestic and international law on the right of the National Assembly, legislature, or government of Quebec to effect the secession of Quebec from Canada unilaterally, which would take precedence in Canada?

As soon as these questions were made public, both parties of the National Assembly, the Bloc Québécois and numerous federalists denounced Ottawa's gesture. An Act respecting the exercise of the fundamental rights and prerogatives of the Québec people and the Québec State was passed in the National Assembly of Quebec by the Parti Québécois government two days after the Clarity Act had been introduced in the Canadian House of Commons.

On 20 August 1998, the Supreme Court answered, concluding that Quebec does not have the right to secede unilaterally under Canadian or international law. However, the federal government would have to enter into negotiations with the Quebec government if Quebecers expressed a clear will to secede. It confirmed that the Canadian Parliament had the power to determine whether or not a referendum question was clear enough to trigger such negotiations. The Canadian constitution would remain in effect until terms of secession were agreed to by all parties involved, and these terms would have to respect principles of democracy, minority and individual rights as outlined in the Canadian constitution.

Both the Government of Quebec and the Government of Canada publicly stated that they were very pleased with the opinion of the Supreme Court, which stated both that Quebec could not legally separate unilaterally from Canada and that the Parliament of Canada would have a 'political obligation' to enter into separation negotiations with Quebec in the event that a clear majority of its populace were to vote in favour of independence.

Three letters 
The Supreme Court reference launched a public debate between Dion and members of the Parti Québécois government in open letters published in the press. Following Lucien Bouchard's open letter to the Premier of New Brunswick, Frank McKenna, in 1997 defending the legality of a unilateral secession, Dion wrote the first of three open letters to leaders in the sovereignty movement. Dion challenged three assertions that Bouchard had made: that a unilateral declaration of independence is supported by international law; that a majority of "50% plus one" was a sufficient threshold for secession; and that international law would protect the territorial integrity of Quebec following a secession. Against the first assertion, Dion argued that the vast majority of international law experts "believe that the right to declare secession unilaterally does not belong to constituent entities of a democratic country such as Canada." In regard to the simple majority argument, Dion argued that due to the momentous changes to Quebecers' lives that would result from secession, a simple majority that could disappear in the face of difficulties would be insufficient to ensure the political legitimacy of the sovereigntist project. In regard to the territorial integrity of Quebec, Dion retorts that "there is neither a paragraph nor a line in international law that protects Quebec's territory but not Canada's. International experience demonstrates that the borders of the entity seeking independence can be called into question, sometimes for reasons based on democracy."

Dion's second open letter, to Quebec's intergovernmental affairs minister Jacques Brassard, came on 19 November 1997. Dion expanded upon his earlier arguments against the territorial integrity of Quebec following secession by highlighting the inconsistency in the argument that Canada is divisible but Quebec is not. Secondly, Dion underscored that without recognition by the Government of Canada and when opposed by a strong minority of citizens, a unilateral declaration of independence faces much difficulty in gaining international recognition.

In Dion's third open letter to Premier Lucien Bouchard came on 25 August 1998, shortly after the Supreme Court ruling on Secession had been handed down. He criticized the Quebec premier for accepting some aspects of the ruling (such as the political obligation for the Government of Canada to negotiate secession following a clear expression of will from the people of Quebec) and not other sections of the ruling (such as the need for a clear majority on a clear question and the unconstitutionality of a unilateral declaration of independence). In regard to the ruling, Dion makes three claims: that the federal government has a role in the selection of the question and the level of support required for it to pass, that secession can only be achieved through negotiation rather than a "unilateral declaration of independence", and that the terms of negotiation could not be decided solely by the Government of Quebec.

Pie incident 
In May 1999, Dion was the object of a pie-in-the-face gag orchestrated by the Montreal group, les Entartistes. The group's stated focus is to "deflate" influential political figures, and they have successfully pied several Canadian federal and provincial politicians, with past targets including Jean Chrétien and Ralph Klein. Dion was not amused and pressed charges, resulting in convictions of assault against two members of the pie-throwing group. They were given suspended sentences.

First International Conference on Federalism 
Dion organized and hosted the First International Conference on Federalism in Mont Tremblant in October 1999 to foster international support for the cause of federalism in Canada. Quebec sovereigntist leaders were granted a prominent role in the conference and used their floor time to denounce Canadian federalism to an international audience to the great annoyance of their federalist host. But Dion's views got a big boost during the closing speech by United States President Bill Clinton. Clinton appeared to echo the Supreme Court Reference, warning that "when a people thinks it should be independent in order to have a meaningful political existence, serious questions should be asked.... Are minority rights as well as majority rights respected? How are we going to co-operate with our neighbours?". Clinton argued that federalism allows peoples seeking recognition of their identity a way to do so without isolating themselves in a nation-state. The speech laid to rest any doubts about the U.S. position on the legality and desirability of unilateral secession in Quebec.

Clarity Act 
The Supreme Court reference and three letters formed the basis for the Clarity Act (Bill C-20) presented by Dion to the House of Commons on 13 December 1999. The legislation established the conditions under which the Government of Canada would enter into negotiations that might lead to secession following a vote by one of the provinces. It stipulated that in order to lead to separation negotiations, a referendum on independence in a given province would have to have "clearly" (according to the judgement of the House of Commons) framed its question to voters in terms of independence, and that the result would have to be a "clear majority" in favour, rather than a "50% plus one" majority. It was passed by the House on 15 March 2000.

Views on federalism 
Dion has often been described in Quebec as a Trudeau centralist due to his strong defence of Canadian federalism and forceful arguments against Quebec sovereigntists. However, his position on federalism is far more nuanced. It would be most accurate to describe him as a federal autonomist. While Dion supports cooperation, flexibility, and interdependence in the Canadian federation, he unequivocally argues against jurisdictional intrusion, stating

Dion's position on provincial rights is not only the result of respect for the Constitution of Canada, but also a strategy to prevent the "joint decision trap" in which the capacity of a government's ability to act is restricted by the need for approval from the other constituent governments.

Dion has contested the political concentration on the division of powers between the federal and provincial governments, arguing that:

In the same vein, Dion was the planner of the 1999 Social Union Framework Agreement, which, according to rabble.ca journalist Duncan Cameron, limited the national spending jurisdiction.  Dion has described Quebec's Bill 101 as "a great law".

Gomery inquiry and 2004 election 
Dion had a prominent role within the Chrétien administration at the time of the sponsorship scandal, and his position as "National Unity" minister (an unofficial term for the Minister of Intergovernmental Affairs) made him a figure of particular interest to the subsequent Commission of Inquiry into the Sponsorship Program and Advertising Activities (the Gomery Commission). He stated before the Gomery Commission that although in mid-2001 he was aware of the disproportionately large percentage of sponsorship funds going to Quebec, he was never directly involved in the administration of the program. Indeed, Dion had been critical of the program while in cabinet, and openly doubted that it would do much to sway Quebecers from sovereignty. Along with most of the other ministers in the Chrétien cabinet, Dion was exonerated of all responsibility in the affair in the Phase I report of the Gomery Commission:

"On the evidence there is no basis for attributing blame or responsibility to any other Minister of the Chrétien Cabinet [excepting Jean Chrétien and Alfonso Gagliano], since they, like all members of Parliament, were not informed of the initiatives being authorized by Mr. [Jean] Pelletier and their funding from the Unity Reserve."

In early 2007, after winning the Liberal Party leadership, Dion suggested that Marc-Yvan Côté's lifetime ban against rejoining the party may have been an excessive punishment for Côté's involvement in the scandal. He later clarified his remarks, saying that he would not take any steps to reinstate Côté's party membership and that such reinstatement would probably not occur. Dion has also defended Jean Pelletier, saying that the former Mayor of Quebec City had "served the country well for decades."

After Paul Martin's assumption of the office of Prime Minister, Dion was dropped from Cabinet as part of a general effort to dissociate the new Liberal government from the outgoing Chrétien administration. He was also criticized by Jean Lapierre, Martin's new Quebec Lieutenant. Lapierre was a Quebec nationalist and founder of the Bloc Québécois and his views on intergovernmental relations differed significantly from Dion's. At one stage in the buildup to the 2004 election, Lapierre described Dion's Clarity Act as "useless", and although Manitoba Premier Gary Doer said the legislation was "extremely popular" in Western Canada, Martin defended Lapierre by saying that the Act would make little difference under his administration. An unconfirmed CTV report in 2004 claimed that Martin's organizers were planning a nomination challenge in Dion's riding.

At the time of the June 2004 federal election, Liberal support had dropped significantly, especially in Quebec where various members of the party had been implicated in the Sponsorship scandal. The Liberal campaign rebounded somewhat in its final days, but the Liberals were still reduced to a minority government due in part to their defeat in Quebec at the hands of the Bloc Québécois.

Minister of the Environment (2004–2006) 
On 20 July 2004, Paul Martin appointed Dion the Minister of the Environment. Shortly after his appointment, a The Globe and Mail article described Dion as being "bent on transforming the environment dossier from the traditional tree-hugger's last stand into a forward-thinking economic portfolio.". Dion championed a "new industrial revolution" focused on "environmentally sustainable technologies and products", and he sought to nurture a collaborative relationship with big business rather than a confrontational one. His maiden speech before the Calgary Chamber of Commerce illustrates just how accommodating he was ready to be:  "Calgary is one of Canada's most impressive economic engines.... Alberta could soon be the second-largest oil-exporting jurisdiction on Earth, behind Saudi Arabia. This is tremendous blessing for Canada." In October 2005, Dion nominated oil and gas executive Allan Amey to head up the government's $1-billion Clean Fund, the largest single element in Dion's Kyoto implementation strategy.

Dion's ministry declined to protect Sakinaw and Cultus sockeye salmon under the Species at Risk Act because it "could cost the sockeye fishing industry $125 million in lost revenue by 2008," This led to some criticism from environmentalists.

Dion earned high praise for his work chairing the U.N. Climate Change summit (COP 11/MOP 1) in Montreal in 2005. Later, when Dion's record as environment minister was under scrutiny in the closing days of the Liberal leadership campaign, former Sierra Club of Canada director and current leader of the Green Party of Canada Elizabeth May came to his defence, calling him a "very very good environment minister."

The government did not make significant progress towards reducing Canada's greenhouse gas emissions during Dion's brief tenure in office. In April 2005, Dion unveiled his "Project Green" to combat climate change, but the program was immediately criticized by some environmental groups for being too timid and for lacking in meaningful regulations. Johanne Gélinas, Canada's environment commissioner, criticized the government's stewardship of marine areas and national parks, as well as its efforts to ensure the safety of drinking water.

In February 2006, after the Liberals had been defeated and the Conservatives had taken over the reins of government, Dion said that Canada would very likely not be able to reach its Kyoto targets. Nevertheless, he argued that this was missing the point:

"Everyone is saying target, target. But ... it is to be more than to reach a target. It's to change the economy. It's to have resource productivity, energy efficiency when we know that energy will be the next crisis for the economy of the world.... All my ministries will be green. Maybe I'll make one department of industry and the environmenta department of sustainability. That's not a commitment, but if you want to change the mind, you have to change structure...."

2006 federal election 
The Liberals were defeated by the Conservative Party under Stephen Harper following the 2006 election.

Dion's family has a husky named "Kyoto" which they purchased "to cheer themselves up after the Liberals lost the election." However, Dion was not the first environment minister or Liberal to have a dog by that name. David Anderson also has a schnauzer named Kyoto which he purchased one week after Canada's ratification of the Kyoto Accord.

2006 Liberal leadership election 

Stéphane Dion announced his candidacy on 7 April, the day of the official beginning of the Liberal leadership race. His leadership campaign was referred to as the three-pillar approach. This approach focused on social justice, economic prosperity, and environmental sustainability, and a claim that a combination of these pillars would bring Canada into the 21st century. He said that his campaign would focus on sustainable development of the economy and creating a "hyper-educated" Canadian workforce in order to compete with China.

Dion was a lower-key figure during most of the leadership race, with much of the media and political attention being centred on the race's two most high-profile candidates, Michael Ignatieff and former Ontario New Democratic Party premier Bob Rae. Federal NDP leader Jack Layton described Dion as "A man of principle and conviction and therefore almost certain not to be elected leader of the Liberal party." For much of the campaign, front-runner Ignatieff had the strongest support in Dion's home province of Quebec. Dion's level of support was similar to that of former Ontario cabinet minister Gerard Kennedy, both candidates being in a distant third/fourth place, though still significantly higher than the other four leadership contestants.

On 2 December 2006, at the Liberal Party leadership convention, Dion finished third after the first ballot, garnering 17.8 per cent of the delegates. After the second ballot, Gerard Kennedy threw his support behind Dion. Earlier, the two leadership contenders had allegedly struck a pact in which the first off the ballot would throw his support to the other. Pundits said that this surprise move had caught the Ignatieff and Rae strategists off guard. When the totals of the third ballot were released, Dion held a narrow lead with 37 per cent, followed closely by Michael Ignatieff with 34.5%. Bob Rae, with only 28.5 per cent, freed his delegates, many of whom backed Dion, as did former leadership candidates Ken Dryden and Joe Volpe. On the fourth ballot, Dion captured 54.7 per cent of votes cast and was declared the 11th leader of the Liberal Party of Canada.

After the election win, Federal NDP leader Jack Layton urged Dion to renounce his dual citizenship with France saying that "I would prefer that a leader of a party hold only Canadian citizenship, because one represents many Canadians, and for me that means that it's better to remain the citizen of one country."

Dion dismissed these calls to give up French citizenship.

Leader of the Official Opposition (2006–2008) 

After Stéphane Dion was elected as the leader, the Liberal Party experienced a sudden surge in their poll numbers. The Conservatives regained their lead shortly thereafter, although the parties were again tied for support in the summer of 2007. (For polling specifics, see Opinion polling in the Canadian federal election, 2008.)

As rumours circulated of a possible election in early 2007, Dion bolstered the image of a Liberal Party renewed and healed of its internal divisions by appointing many of his former leadership rivals to key campaign positions. Michael Ignatieff was named deputy leader, Bob Rae and Scott Brison became platform development co-chairs, Gerard Kennedy was named special adviser for election readiness and renewal, Martha Hall Findlay was charged with platform outreach, and Ken Dryden, who received special acknowledgement from Dion for being "the heart of our party", was tasked "to be everywhere".

In early January 2007, Dion made a leadership decision in regards to Wajid Khan, a Liberal MP who was serving as a Middle-East adviser to the Prime Minister. Dion thought it was inappropriate for a member of the Official Opposition to be serving the government so he told Khan to give up the position. Dion was confident that Khan would stay with the caucus and give up advising the Prime Minister, but Khan chose to cross the floor, and join the Conservative caucus instead.

On 18 January 2007, Dion unveiled the remainder of the Liberal opposition's shadow cabinet (see Official Opposition Shadow Cabinet (Canada) for a complete list of appointments). Shortly after Dion led the Liberal caucus in its rejection of the 2007 Conservative budget, arguing that it failed Canadians on economic prosperity, social justice and environmental sustainability.

In response, the Conservatives would launch a series of attack ads aimed directly at Dion, attacking his leadership abilities and record as Environment Minister Similar ads attacking Dion would appear in November over statements that Dion would prefer new spending on health care and social programs to cuts to the Goods and Services Tax introduced by the Conservatives.

On 3 June 2008, Stéphane Dion voted to implement a program which would "allow conscientious objectors...to a war not sanctioned by the United Nations...to...remain in Canada..."

Parliamentary Opposition 

On 1 February, Dion tabled a motion challenging the Conservatives to reaffirm Canada's commitment to the Kyoto Protocol, attempting to capitalize on a 2002 letter in which Prime Minister Harper described the Accord as a "socialist scheme" that is based on "tentative and contradictory scientific evidence" and designed to suck money out of rich countries. Tory environment minister John Baird responded by blaming the Liberals for what he described as a "shameful record over 13 years of inaction on the environment," while Stephen Harper said that his government would "stabilize emissions." Dion's non-binding motion passed on 5 February.

On 27 February, Dion's Liberals, together with Bloc Québécois and NDP members of Parliament, voted down a Harper government proposal to extend two controversial provisions of the Anti-Terrorism Act for another three years. Dion argued that the measures — which allowed police to arrest and detain terror suspects for three days without a warrant and which allowed judges to force witnesses to testify in terror cases — "have done nothing to fight against terrorism" and "have not been helpful and have continued to create some risk for civil liberties."

On 12 April 2007, Dion announced that the Liberals would not run a candidate against Green Party leader Elizabeth May in the Nova Scotia riding of Central Nova (then represented by Conservative Peter MacKay) in return for the Green Party leader's agreement not to run a Green candidate in Dion's riding of Saint-Laurent—Cartierville. The deal was criticized by the Conservatives and the NDP (Jack Layton had rejected earlier attempts by May to cut a "backroom" deal with his party), and also by some within the Liberal Party. Dion later gave reassurance that the controversial deal was "an exceptional circumstance where Liberal voters are invited to help her [May] to win against Peter MacKay."

On 8 November 2007, Dion released a policy plan, that he compared to the United Kingdom's Labour Party under former Prime Minister Tony Blair. Dion mentioned that his party will tackle poverty in Canada in order to create a "greener", "richer" and "fairer" Canada. He set up targets to reduce general poverty by 30 percent and child poverty by 50 percent as well as helping working families with work rewards as well as increasing the Canada Child Tax benefit, increasing guaranteed revenues for seniors. In an editorial in the National Post, economist Alex MacMillan notes that the poverty targets Dion has set are based on a Statistics Canada measure that the statistical agency has stated is not a poverty measure (LICO), and that by using what is in effect a relative income measure rather than an absolute poverty measure, Dion is essentially aiming to flatten the income distribution of Canadians. However, there is no official poverty rate for Canada that Dion could otherwise use, and some other political parties also quote LICO figures as poverty rates.

Internal discord 
The first federal by-elections contested by the Liberals under Dion's leadership took place on 18 September 2007, in three Quebec ridings: Roberval—Lac-Saint-Jean, Outremont and Saint-Hyacinthe—Bagot. The party's candidates were defeated by large margins in all three races. The Outremont by-election was deemed a crucial test for Dion's leadership by some pundits, as it had been held by the Liberals almost uninterruptedly since 1935. Others said it was a "poor measure of where the parties really stand." Dion's handpicked candidate Jocelyn Coulon, who was selected over Justin Trudeau, was defeated by the NDP's Thomas Mulcair. A Dion aide blamed the Outremont by-election on several factors, including poor organization, lack of communications, and lack of a clear policy on Quebec, while former MP Jean Lapierre suggested that it was due to Dion's 14% approval rating in the province. In addition, the Halifax Chronicle-Herald reported that unidentified "Dion loyalists" were accusing Michael Ignatieff supporters of undermining by-election efforts. Though Ignatieff phoned up Dion to deny the allegations, The Globe and Mail suggested that the report had a negative impact on the Liberals' morale, citing the NDP's widening lead after the article's release. Undaunted, Dion declared: "From this defeat, we can learn something and work together as a united party."

On 23 September 2007, Liberal Party national director Jamie Carroll sparked controversy when, during discussions about whether francophone Quebecers should be hired in order to appeal to francophone voters, he commented: "Do we also have to hire people from the Chinese community to represent the Chinese community?"  Carroll argued that the comment was taken out of context, but it nevertheless raised the hackles of many Liberals in Quebec, prompting calls from MPs Pablo Rodriguez and Liza Frulla for Carroll to be fired. Stéphane Dion stood by Carroll's version of events and rejected calls for Carroll's dismissal. On 10 October, a Liberal press release announced Carroll's resignation and commended him for his "loyalty to our leader and to our party".

Marcel Proulx resigned as Dion's Quebec lieutenant hours before the Harper government's throne speech, taking the fall for the three by-election losses. Dion first approached Montreal MPs Denis Coderre and Pablo Rodriguez to succeed Proulx, but they declined. That evening he named Senator Céline Hervieux-Payette to the vacant post. While the Party was divided on whether or not the government should be toppled on a confidence vote regarding the Throne Speech, Dion mentioned in a statement in the House of Commons on 17 October that the Liberals will support the Throne Speech but with major amendments including the Kyoto Protocol and the end of mission in Afghanistan by 2009 and had criticized the government on several aspects including the economy, seniors and child poverty, the crime policy, the Senate reform. The latter amendment proposal was rejected by the New Democratic Party who are favouring an immediate end to the mission. Dion explained the decision as that Canadians are not willing to have a third election in just over three years. All Liberal members abstained from voting on the Throne Speech on 24 October 2007, which passed 126–79.

Marc Garneau initially stated that he was not part of Dion's vision after being passed over for a riding nomination. Since then, Dion and Garneau have reconciled, and Garneau ran to succeed outgoing longtime MP Lucienne Robillard in Westmount—Ville-Marie.

The Liberal Party won three of four by-elections held on 17 March 2008, as Dion's former leadership rivals Bob Rae and Martha Hall Findlay won convincing victories in Toronto Centre and Willowdale and Joyce Murray was narrowly returned for Vancouver Quadra. The Conservatives won a fourth contest in the northern Saskatchewan riding of Desnethé—Missinippi—Churchill River, which the Liberals had narrowly taken in the previous election. Dion declared the results a victory for his party, while also noting that some Liberal support was siphoned off to the Green Party. Some journalists described the outcome as a mixed result for both the Liberal Party and Dion's leadership.

Visit to Afghanistan 
In January 2008, Dion and Ignatieff went to Kandahar, Afghanistan to visit a provincial reconstruction team. The visit was supposed to be secret, but was leaked to the public by Conservative junior minister Helena Guergis. After his return, Dion angrily criticized Guergis' action, saying that she put him at risk for being attacked by the Taliban. In a letter to Harper, Dion demanded Guergis' resignation or firing, saying that Guergis committed a "gross breach of Canadian security" that raised doubts about her fitness for Cabinet.

2008 federal election 

In 2008, as part of a measure for cutting greenhouse emissions, Dion called for a carbon price. He also praised a similar measure introduced and approved by the British Columbia government in the 2008 provincial budget as well as the province of Quebec that introduced a carbon-based tax which revenues will be used for green technologies. Critics from other parties as well as some Liberal MPs said that the concept would be "too confusing, expensive and politically risky". Environment Minister John Baird stated that the plan was "made on Bay Street and is actually supported by big business and polluters". The plan received support from David Suzuki who added on CTV's Question Period that: "To oppose the carbon tax plan, it's just nonsense. It's certainly the way we got to go".

In June 2008, Dion unveiled the new policy called The Green Shift (le Tournant vert) and explained that this tax shift would create an ecotax on carbon while reducing personal and corporate income taxes. He stated that the taxation on carbon would generate up to $15 billion per year in revenues to offset the reduction in income tax revenue.

The plan was immediately criticized by Prime Minister Harper, who described it as a tax grab and compared it to the National Energy Program that the federal Liberal government adopted in the 1980s. On 11 September 2008, NDP leader Jack Layton also criticized the Green Shift, saying that it would hurt consumers, would be nothing more than a nuisance for energy producers, and evaluates emission equally across all sectors instead of maximizing reductions where the cost is lowest. Layton further noted that Dion's proposal does not set a target for reducing emissions.

Green Shift Inc., a Toronto-based consulting firm, filed an $8.5 million lawsuit against the Liberal Party on 9 July 2008, citing trademark infringement. The company also sought a court injunction against the Liberal Party to stop using the name. Dion responded that the lawsuit was "deplorable" and added that the Liberals are not a commercial company and did not see any legal problems for using the term "Green Shift".

Near the end of the campaign, Dion had an interview with CTV Halifax's anchor Steve Murphy, where Dion asked the host three times to restart the interview because he didn't understand the mixed tense and timing of a question about the economy: "If you were Prime Minister now, what would you have done about the economy and this crisis that Mr. Harper has not done?" Murphy initially agreed not to air it but network executives decided to release it, generating controversy. On election night, Dion angrily refused to speak to the CTV reporters scrumming around him, saying "The last one I want to speak first [sic] is CTV – you understand that?". Dion's wife Janine Krieber also drew some controversy in the 2008 campaign. She complained that she was being muzzled by the Liberals, though party officials denied it. Reportedly, insiders had concerns that the outspoken Krieber would not stick to the party line and take the focus away from Dion. Krieber also refused at last minute to introduce Dion at a women's event because she felt that the brief speech prepared for her by campaign headquarters was undignified.

The Liberals lost support on 14 October federal election, being reduced to 77 seats, down from 103 won in the 2006 election. They captured only 26.2 per cent of the popular vote — two points lower than the disastrous showing in 1984 under John Turner and only four points ahead of the party's worst ever result in 1867. Dion became the first Liberal Opposition Leader to fail to make a net gain in seats at his first election since Lester B. Pearson in 1958. Dion said that the party lost because he did not get the Liberal message out, and took responsibility saying "If people are asking why, it's because I failed." Dion added that he never had a chance to establish his personal image with voters because of the Conservative ads depicting him as a "dithering egghead". Liberal veterans described Dion as a "lone wolf" who dismissed suggestions from his senior advisers to avoid using the Green Shift as an election platform. A party insider also said that Dion was reluctant to emphasize the Liberal team because he felt that he was being overshadowed by leadership rival Bob Rae.

2008 parliamentary dispute 

The Liberals and NDP reached a deal to topple the current government and form a minority coalition government, with support from the Bloc Québécois. In the agreement, Dion would have been the Prime Minister (and Liberal leader) until May, when the Liberal Party would elect his successor. Dion sent a letter of the plan to Governor General Michaëlle Jean, and the opposition had scheduled a non-confidence motion for 8 December 2008. To draw public support, Prime Minister Harper and Dion both addressed the nation on 3 December 2008. Dion's Liberal rebuttal, however, was considered poor in production quality and delivered late to the networks, and some believed that this had undermined support for the coalition. On 4 December 2008, the Governor General granted Prime Minister Harper's request to suspend parliament until January 2009, thereby delaying a scheduled non-confidence vote and the likely defeat of the Conservative government.

Resignation 
Shortly afterwards, Dion came under increasing pressure from the party to immediately step down as Liberal leader. On 8 December, Dion announced that he would resign the leadership as soon as his successor was chosen amongst the members of the party. His resignation took effect on 10 December 2008, upon the selection of Michael Ignatieff as interim leader. This makes Dion the second permanent Liberal leader in Canadian history not to become Prime Minister, after Edward Blake in 1887. On his retirement, Dion became the shortest serving non-interim leader of the Liberal Party since Confederation—serving for approximately four months less time (740 days to 855 days) of the next shortest serving leader, Paul Martin (2003–2006). Dion delivered a farewell speech on 2 May 2009, at the Liberal Party leadership convention.

Post-leadership 

Ignatieff appointed a smaller shadow cabinet after being named interim leader and did not give Dion a critical role within it. Over the course of Ignatieff's time as leader Dion stayed out of the limelight, working quietly in his riding and expressing his views privately to Ignatieff.

In September 2009, it was reported that Denis Coderre, Ignatieff's Quebec lieutenant, was attempting to oust Dion and fellow Montreal-area MPs Raymonde Folco, Lise Zarac, and Bernard Patry for the next election, with the hope of replacing them with star candidates. However, Coderre ended up resigning as Quebec Lieutenant during this time over conflicting views with Ignatieff and his inner circle.

A 25 October 2009, poll suggested that Ignatieff had a lower popularity than Dion at his worst showing as Liberal leader. A month later Dion's wife Janine Krieber wrote a scathing letter on her Facebook page in which she suggested that the Liberal Party was in full collapse and the future appeared bleak. She questioned Ignatieff's ability to lead the party out of its current woes, alleging that party members were duped by Ignatieff and would have recognized his obvious shortcomings if they'd only taken the time to read his academic writings. Krieber claimed that Dion was working to rebuild the party after the disappointing 2008 election, but their efforts were stymied by Ignatieff, who turned down the coalition with the other opposition parties, and who "dethroned Dion without a leadership race". Dion was said to have no involvement in the criticism letter and later asked Krieber to remove the Facebook post, which talks of deep divisions in the Liberal Party.

In November 2011, Dion was awarded with the Fray International Sustainability Award at Fray International Symposium in Mexico, for his work and advocacy towards sustainable development.

2011 federal election 

The Liberal Party fell to third place on 2 May 2011, in a federal election for the first time in Canadian history. The party won just 19 per cent of the popular vote, down from the 26 per cent the party won under Dion, and elected only 34 MPs. The New Democratic Party formed the Official Opposition, mainly as a result of a surge in support in Quebec. Dion was one of just seven Liberal MPs re-elected in his home province, he won 43.43 per cent of the popular in his riding which was the highest vote share for a Liberal in Quebec.

Following his re-election in May 2011, Dion had a much more prominent role within the Liberal caucus than he had after his resignation as leader in 2008. Interim Liberal leader Bob Rae appointed Dion as the Liberals Critic for Intergovernmental Affairs and spokesman for la Francophonie. A month after the election Dion attended the NDP's federal convention as the observer for the Liberal Party, at that time he called on NDP leader not to appease separatists as a way to maintain his party's support in Quebec. He also criticized the NDP's policy that 50-per-cent-plus-one in a referendum would justify Quebec separating from Canada.

2015 federal election 

Dion campaigned outside his riding for much of the 2015 federal election, visiting areas such as Sudbury, Ontario to support local candidates and attack the Conservative government's record on the environment and healthcare. The 2015 election was a resounding victory for Justin Trudeau's Liberal Party, and Dion was comfortably re-elected to an eighth term representing the newly reformulated Saint-Laurent riding.

Minister of Foreign Affairs (2015–2017) 

On 4 November 2015, Dion was appointed the Minister of Foreign Affairs in Justin Trudeau's cabinet. Dion was also named as chair of the cabinet's committee on environment and climate change. As a senior cabinet minister, Dion was third in the order of succession. One of his first foreign policy statements included a call to diffuse Sunni-Shiite tensions in the aftermath of Nimr al-Nimrs execution.

In a March 2016 speech at the University of Ottawa, Dion used "responsible conviction" – a term syncretized from the work of German sociologist Max Weber – to describe the Trudeau government's foreign policy. Dion sought re-engagement with the world, including authoritarian regimes such as Russia and Iran and a focus on multilateralism, climate change, and the United Nations. Dion indicated that Canada would oppose capital punishment for Canadians imprisoned abroad and would change its contribution to the fight against the Islamic State of Iraq and the Levant from providing airstrikes to providing special forces trainers. Dion also tied the concept of responsible conviction to continuing some policies of the previous Stephen Harper government in a modified manner, such as continuing its maternal and newborn health initiative but with new funding for abortion and family planning. He also justified continuing a $15 billion sale of light armored vehicles to Saudi Arabia despite its human rights abuses to protect Canadian jobs and preserve Canada's credibility in signing major international deals, but committed to reassessing the rules on Canadian export permits so that future deals would conform to Canadian interests such as human rights promotion. Dion ended his speech by rejecting the concept of Canada as an honest broker, because that term had become too associated with moral relativism and lack of conviction, instead saying that Canada had to be "a fair-minded and determined peace builder."

On 10 January 2017, Dion was replaced as Minister of Foreign Affairs by Chrystia Freeland in a cabinet shuffle, with the move being seen in part as a response to United States President-elect Donald Trump's incoming presidency.

Diplomatic career (2017–present) 
After his departure from cabinet, Dion was reportedly offered the position of Canada's Ambassador to the European Union and Germany. Other sources stated that he could be appointed Canada's Ambassador to France.

Dion announced his retirement from politics, making no mention of either potential position, in a statement released shortly after the cabinet shuffle. He confirmed, in his farewell speech to the House of Commons on 31 January 2017, that he had accepted the position of Ambassador to the EU and Germany instead of accepting an offer from the Université de Montréal. His resignation from Parliament officially took effect on 6 February 2017.

Dion served as Ambassador to Germany until 1 June 2022, when he was appointed Canada's Ambassador to France and Monaco while retaining his role as special envoy to the European Union.

Electoral record 

Source: Elections Canada

Honorary Degrees
 Stephane Dion has received many Honorary Degrees, These Include

Honorary Degrees

See also
List of foreign ministers in 2017
Université Laval

Notes and references

External links 

How'd They Vote?: Stéphane Dion's voting history and quotes

 Canadian Encyclopedia entry on Stéphane Dion

|-

|-

|-

|-

|-

1955 births
Academics in Quebec
Ambassadors of Canada to Germany
Ambassadors of Canada to the European Union
Canadian Ministers of Foreign Affairs
Canadian Ministers of Intergovernmental Affairs
Canadian political scientists
Canadian Roman Catholics
Canadian sociologists
French people of Canadian descent
French Quebecers
Leaders of the Liberal Party of Canada
Leaders of the Opposition (Canada)
Liberal Party of Canada MPs
Living people
Members of the 26th Canadian Ministry
Members of the 27th Canadian Ministry
Members of the 29th Canadian Ministry
Members of the House of Commons of Canada from Quebec
Members of the King's Privy Council for Canada
People from Saint-Laurent, Quebec
Politicians from Montreal
Politicians from Quebec City
Sciences Po alumni
Université Laval alumni
Academic staff of the Université de Montréal